The 3rd Nova Scotia general election may refer to:

Nova Scotia general election, 1761, the 3rd general election to take place in the Colony of Nova Scotia, for the 3rd General Assembly of Nova Scotia
1874 Nova Scotia general election, the 25th overall general election for Nova Scotia, for the (due to a counting error in 1859) 26th Legislative Assembly of Nova Scotia, but considered the 3rd general election for the Canadian province of Nova Scotia